Callum Gibbins (born 14 September 1988) is a New Zealand rugby union player who plays as a flanker for Old Glory DC of Major League Rugby (MLR) in the United States.

He previously played flanker for the Glasgow Warriors in the Pro14.

Rugby union career

Amateur career

Gibbins was drafted to Stirling County in the Scottish Premiership for the 2017–18 season.

Gibbins has been drafted to Glasgow Hawks in the Scottish Premiership for the 2018–19 season.

Professional career

Gibbins moved to Palmerston North in 2007 to study for a Bachelor of Sport and Exercise at Massey University. He made his Manawatu Turbos debut in 2009 against Wellington.

He was named in the  Wider Training Group for the 2013 Super Rugby season. In 2015 Gibbins signed a full contract to be in the Hurricanes first team squad after two strong years in the Wider Training Group. He went on to play in all but one of the Hurricanes fixtures in 2015. He extended his Hurricanes contract to the end of the 2016 season.

Gibbins made his debut for Glasgow Warriors in September 2017 in their league match versus Ospreys.

He was made co-captain of the club for season 2018–19.

On 6 November 2020, it was confirmed that Gibbins travels to USA to join Old Glory DC in the Major League Rugby competition on a player-coach capacity.

References

External links
 itsrugby.co.uk (player statistics)

Living people
New Zealand rugby union players
Manawatu rugby union players
1988 births
Rugby union flankers
Hurricanes (rugby union) players
Rugby union players from New Plymouth
Glasgow Warriors players
Stirling County RFC players
People educated at Inglewood High School, New Zealand
Massey University alumni
Glasgow Hawks players
Expatriate rugby union players in Scotland
New Zealand expatriate sportspeople in Scotland
Old Glory DC players